Allegheny Highlands may refer to:

Allegheny Mountains
Allegheny Highlands Council